Slicklizzard is an unincorporated community in Walker County, Alabama, United States.

According to tradition, Slicklizard was so named because local miners had to crawl through muddy passages and in the process became "slick as a lizard".

References

Unincorporated communities in Walker County, Alabama
Unincorporated communities in Alabama